Mika Antero Helin (born 7 April 1978) is a Finnish retired footballer. He played a total of 84 games in the Veikkausliiga during a senior career which spanned 1998 to 2012. Helin also played futsal at a high level and competed internationally with the Finnish national futsal team.

Career

Football
Helin played in the top-tier Veikkausliiga during 1998 and 2001–2007, representing PK-35, FC Jokerit, FC Haka, TPS, and FC Honka. He played a total of 84 games in the Veikkausliiga and won Finnish Cup silver with FC Haka in 2003 and Finnish Cup bronze with PK-35 in 1998.

In his post-Veikkausliiga career, Helin played with FC Viikingit in the 2008 Ykkönen. During 2009–2012, he served as player-coach for FC Kiffen of the Kakkonen.

International 
Helin appeared twice with the Finnish national U19 team, making his debut against Moldova in 1996.

Futsal
Helin also played futsal at a professional level and was active with the FC Kiffen futsal team as recently as 2017. He appeared in 10 international matches with the Finnish national futsal team and scored 1 goal.

Personal information
Helin is 175 cm tall (5' 9) and weighs 68 kg (149.9 lbs).

References
Content in this edit is translated from the existing Finnish Wikipedia article at :fi:Mika Helin; see its history for attribution.

Finnish footballers
Finnish men's futsal players
FC Jokerit players
FC Honka players
Veikkausliiga players
1978 births
Living people
FC Kiffen 08 players
FC Viikingit players
FC Haka players
PK-35 Vantaa (men) players
Association football defenders
Footballers from Helsinki